e-Aksharayan is an optical character recognition engine for Indian languages. Some of research work from e-Aksharayan has been published in different conferences and journals.

Screenshots

References

External links 

Optical character recognition